Chang Liang-jen (born 21 August 1946) is a Taiwanese politician and diplomat. He was the ROC Representative to Indonesia since 22 January 2014 until December 2016.

ROC Representative to Indonesia

Garbage trucks donation
In April 2014, Taiwanese business people in Indonesia donated four garbage trucks through Chang to Jakarta Lieutenant Governor Basuki Tjahaja Purnama to help the city government to handle waste-related issues. Chang said that the help was given because all this while, many Taiwanese business people have cooperated a lot in various sectors with the Jakarta City Government. Basuki responded by saying that Taiwan has helped Jakarta a lot in handling its continuous flood problems, such as by the Tzu Chi Foundation.

See also
 Taipei Economic and Cultural Representative Office
 List of diplomatic missions of Taiwan

References

1946 births
Living people
Representatives of Taiwan to Indonesia
Taiwanese Ministers of National Defense
National Chengchi University alumni
Harvard University alumni
Representatives of Taiwan to Israel